Roberts Bukarts (born June 27, 1990) is a Latvian professional ice hockey forward for HC Vítkovice Ridera of the Czech Extraliga (ELH).

Playing career
Bukarts made his Kontinental Hockey League debut with Dinamo Riga  during the 2009–10 season. 

He has formerly played with PSG Zlín, HC Oceláři Třinec, HC Sparta Praha of the Czech Extraliga (EHL). He was a first round selection in the 2009 KHL Junior Draft.

Career statistics

Regular season and playoffs

International

References

External links
 

1990 births
Living people
Latvian ice hockey forwards
Dinamo Riga players
People from Jūrmala
HC Oceláři Třinec players
Severstal Cherepovets players
HC Sparta Praha players
HC Vítkovice players
PSG Berani Zlín players
Latvian expatriate sportspeople in the United States
HK Riga players
HK Liepājas Metalurgs players
Latvian expatriate sportspeople in Russia
Latvian expatriate sportspeople in the Czech Republic
Expatriate ice hockey players in the United States
Expatriate ice hockey players in the Czech Republic
Expatriate ice hockey players in Russia
Latvian expatriate ice hockey people